Svenstrup is a town on Zealand, Denmark. It is located in Slagelse Municipality, 3 km north-east of Korsør, 4 km north-east of Forlev-Vemmelev and 10 km south-west of Slagelse.

The town has nearly grown together with the surrounding villages of Frølunde, Knivkær, Stibjerg Huse and Ny Halseby.

References

Cities and towns in Region Zealand
Slagelse Municipality